Cyrtodactylus feae  is a species of gecko, a lizard in the family Gekkonidae. The species is native to Southeast Asia.

Etymology
The specific name, feae, is in honor of Leonardo Fea, who was an Italian explorer and naturalist.

Geographic range
C. feae is found in Myanmar and Thailand.

Habitat
The preferred natural habitat of C. feae is forest.

Description
The holotype of C. feae, which may be a juvenile, has a snout-to-vent length (SVL) of only .

Reproduction
C. feae is oviparous.

References

Further reading
Boulenger GA (1893). "Concluding Report on the Reptiles and Batrachians obtained in Burma by Signor L. Fea, dealing with the Collection made in Pegu and the Karin Hills in 1887-88. Annali del Museo Civico di Storia Naturale di Genova, Second Series 13: 304-347 + Plates VII-XII. (Gymnodactylus feae, new species, pp. 313-314 + Plate VII, figures 1, 1a, 1b, 1c).
Rösler H (2000). "Kommentierte liste der rezent, subrezent und fossil bekannten Geckotaxa (Reptilia: Gekkonomorpha)". Gekkota 2: 28–153. (Cyrtodactylus feae, new combination, p. 65). (in German).
Smith MA (1935). The Fauna of British India, Including Ceylon and Burma. Reptilia and Amphibia. Vol. II.—Sauria. London: Secretary of State for India in Council. (Taylor and Francis, printers). xiii + 440 pp. + Plate I + two maps. (Gymnodactylus feae, p. 45).

Cyrtodactylus
Reptiles described in 1893
Taxa named by George Albert Boulenger